Donald Mackay, MacKay, or McKay may refer to:

Donald Mackay, 5th of Strathnaver (died 1370), chief of the ancient Clan Mackay
Donald Mackay, 11th of Strathnaver (died 1550), chief of the ancient Clan Mackay
Donald Mackay, 1st Lord Reay (1591–1649), Scottish peer and soldier
Donald Mackay (fur trader) (1753–1833), Canadian trader with the North West Company
Donald Mackay (Royal Navy officer) (1780–1850), British admiral
Donald McKay (1810–1880), Canadian-American shipbuilder
  (1938) one of the first C2 ships
Donald McKay (politician) (1836–1895), Canadian politician
Donald McKay (scout) (1836–1899), American scout, actor, and spokesman
Donald Mackay, 11th Lord Reay (1839–1921), Dutch-born British administrator and Liberal politician
Donald McDonald Mackay (1845–1904), Australian politician
Donald George Mackay (1870–1958), Australian explorer and long-distance cyclist
Donald McKay (footballer) (fl. 1890s), Scottish footballer
Donald W. MacKay (1874–1952), Canadian politician
Donald Morrison MacKay (1889–1953), Canadian politician
Donald Brenham McKay, former mayor of Tampa, Florida
Don McKay (politician) (1908–1988), New Zealand politician
Donald Hugh Mackay (1914–1979), mayor of Calgary, Alberta
Donald A. Mackay (1914–2005), illustrator
Donald MacCrimmon MacKay (1922–1987), Scottish physicist
Donald Mackay (anti-drugs campaigner) (1933–1977), Australian politician and anti-drugs campaigner
Donald Mackay (scientist) (born 1936), Canadian scientist of environmental chemistry
Don Mackay (born 1940), Scottish football player
Donald Mackay, Baron Mackay of Drumadoon (1946–2018), Scottish judge
Donald Mackay (medical doctor) (died 1981)
Donald Mackay-Coghill (born 1941), South African cricketer